Fibuloides aestuosa, the greenish chestnut moth, is a moth of the family Tortricidae. It is known from China (Anhui, Henan, Hubei, Guangxi, Liaoning, Sichuan, Yunnan, Zhejiang), Korea, Japan, northern India and Bengal.

The wingspan is 17–21 mm. On Hokkaido island in Japan there is one generation per year, in the south of Japan there are more generations.

The larvae feed on Castanea mollissima and Castanea cranata. They are considered a pest on Castanea crenata. The larvae bore into the nuts.

References

External links
Eurasian Tortricidae

Enarmoniini
Moths of Japan
Moths described in 1912